Thomas Rogers (June 23, 1927 – April 1, 2007) was an American novelist.

Life and career
Born in Chicago, Illinois, Rogers graduated from Harvard University in 1950 before earning a master's degree and a PhD from the University of Iowa. He was twice nominated for the National Book Award for Fiction, for his first novel The Pursuit of Happiness, which was adapted into a 1971 film, and his second novel The Confessions of a Child of the Century by Samuel Heather (1972). His final two novels were both centered on the same protagonist. Before his retirement in 1992, he taught at Pennsylvania State University for three decades and lived in State College, Pennsylvania.

Novels
The Pursuit of Happiness (1968)
The Confessions of a Child of the Century by Samuel Heather (1972)
At the Shores (1980)
Jerry Engels (2005)

References

External links
Retrospective book review of At the Shores and Jerry Engels by New York Review of Books

American male novelists
1927 births
Harvard University alumni
University of Iowa alumni
2007 deaths
Pennsylvania State University faculty
20th-century American novelists
21st-century American novelists
20th-century American male writers
21st-century American male writers
Novelists from Pennsylvania